Liesbeth Messer-Heijbroek (born Amsterdam, 25 April 1914: died Breda, 6 November 2007) was a Dutch sculptor and medal maker.

Born Liesbeth Heijbroek, she studied in the city of her birth at the Rijksakademie (National academy) under both Jan Bronner and Theo van Reijn. In 1940 she married an architect called Willem Messer and the couple settled in Zeeland, in the south-west of the country. The war memorial (1948) in the main cemetery at Domburg was a project shared between the two of them.

Works on public display

Domburg 
 'Knielende vrouw' (kneeling woman), monument Second World War (1948), Algemene begraafplaats

Middelburg
 twee beeldengroepen (Two men : two women) (1956), Langevielebrug
 drie sporters (1960), bronzen gevelreliëf aan de Bachensteene (voormalige gymzaal)

Oostburg 
 Monument: Second World War  (1951), in the public cemetery in the old town
 Eenhoorn (Unicorn) (1952), Eenhoornplantsoen (Unicorn Square)

Sources

External link

1914 births
2007 deaths
Dutch sculptors
Artists from Amsterdam
People from Zeeland
20th-century sculptors